Phassus exclamationis is a moth of the family Hepialidae. It is known from Mexico.

References

Moths described in 1938
Hepialidae